This is a list of the 300 members who were elected to the Hellenic Parliament in the 2007 Greek legislative election.

Of the 300 elected, 34 New Democracy MPs were new to the house, 26 PASOK MPs, 15 KKE MPs, 10 SYRIZA MPs, and 10 LAOS MPs.

Members of Parliament 
Changes table below records all changes in party affiliation.

Changes
 January 31, 2008: Kostas Koukodimos (ND) declares independent.
May 7, 2008: Diamanto Manolakou, Antonis Skyllakos and Giannis Giokas instead of Elpida Pantelaki, Takis Tsiogas and Dimos Koumbouris (KKE).
 July 23, 2008: Kostas Koukodimos returns to New Democracy's parliamentary team.
 September 30, 2008 Stavros Dailakis is expelled from ND's parliamentary team.
 October 8, 2008 Stavros Dailakis returns to ND's parliamentary team.
 November 11, 2008 Petros Tatoulis (ND) declares independent.
 May 8, 2009: Andreas Makripidis replaced Christos Verelis who resigned over scandal allegations. (PASOK)
 May 22, 2009: Giorgos Papakonstantinou and Sylvana Rapti resigned as they were elected as MEPs. They were replaced by Giannis Vlantis and Thanassis Tsouras accordingly (PASOK). 
 June 6, 2009:  replaced Thanos Plevris who was elected in the European parliament (LAOS).
 June 16, 2009: Sophia Andriopoulou replaced Mihalis Papagiannakis who died on May 26. (SYRIZA)
 August 31, 2009: Ioannis Manolis resigned over dissatisfaction with his own party. He is replaced by Dimitris Kranias (ND).

See also
2007 Greek legislative election
List of parliamentary constituencies of Greece

References

External links
Full list by the newspaper Eleftherotypia (in Greek) 

 
2007-2009
2007 in Greek politics